Fan Lihua (樊梨花) is a fictional folk heroine in Chinese folklore and a legendary female general from the Western Liang during the early years of the Tang Dynasty. She was the wife of Xue Dingshan and the daughter-in-law of the famous early Tang Dynasty general, Xue Rengui.

Fan Lihua is one of the four folk heroines of ancient China along with Hua Mulan, Mu Guiying and Liang Hongyu. The story of her husband Xue Dingshan, fighting alongside each other on the battlefield is well-known and has had a far-reaching influence. Fan Lihua's legendary stories are expressed in various forms of literary and artistic works, especially in movies, TV dramas and songs.

Records
The first written record of Fan Lihua is the "Shuo Tang San Zhuan" (说唐三传, Three Stories from the Tang Dynasty) by Rulian Jushi, written during the Qianlong period of the Qing Dynasty. One of the three stories is "Xue Dingshan Zhengxi", which is about the love story between Xue Dingshan and Fan Lihua. The story of Fan Lihua was later incorporated into a number of works.

Legend 
According to legend, Fan Lihua was born in Western Liang State during the Tang Dynasty. Fan Lihua's mother passed away at an early age, leaving her to be raised by her father and brothers. Her father, Fan Hong, was a general assigned to defend the borders of the Western Turks who later converted to a Turk. Both Fan Lihua's brothers, Han Long and Han Hu, were assistants to Fan Hong.

Fan Lihua, who had developed a forthright, outspoken personality, practiced martial arts with her master, Lishan Laomu, for eight years and was said to have been highly skilled in martial arts. Lishan Laomu, told Fan Lihua that she was destined to marry a Tang citizen and that their marriage would unite the two kingdoms and bring forth a period of peace and harmony.

Unfortunately, this was not to be. Fan Lihua married Xue Dingshan whose father, Xue Rengui, was a renowned general, loyal to the early Tang Dynasty. The Xue family despised Western Liang citizens, with whom they had long been at war. Upon marrying into the Xue Family, Fan Lihua convinced her father and brothers to surrender and take refuge under the Tang Empire, but before they could reach China, her father and brothers were slain by General Yang Fan, a former fiancé of Fan Lihua. Seeking to avenge their deaths, Fan Lihua continued to assist her husband in the fight against the invaders.

After many years of fighting, the Tang Empire were victorious against Western Liang. During the final battle of the war, Yang Fan was killed by Fan Lihua. Yang Fan's soul was said to have exacted revenge on Fan Lihua by reincarnating as her son with Xue Dingshan, Xue Gang. Later in life, Xue Gang, under the influence of alcohol would kill the Seventh Prince of Tang who was on tour during the Lantern Festival. Upon learning of the death of his son, Emperor Gaozong of Tang died of shock. Xue Gang was determined guilty of the crime of slaying a king and the entire Xue Family was sentenced to death by Wu Zetian. Xue Gang was able to escape his execution and Fan Lihua was miraculously rescued Lishan Laomu, who brought her to heaven.

Some folktales say that Xue Dingshan and Fan Lihua were originally the Golden Boy and Jade Girl. The Jade Emperor was furious with them and wanted to punish them for breaking the celestial utensils. Fortunately, the Old Man of the South Pole begged for their mercy and was demoted to the mortal world. The Jade Girl accidentally bumped into the Five Ghost Stars whilst leaving the Heaven hall, and then smiled apologetically, knowing that the Five Ghost Stars would also go down to the earth and get entangled with the Jade Girl. The Five Ghost Stars were Yang Fan.

Worship
Fan Lihua is worshipped as a deity in Chinese folk religion, where she is also known as Marshal Fan Lihua. Her statue often appears in temples dedicated to Lishan Laomu.

In popular culture

The story of Fan Lihua and her husband Xue Dingshan is often used as a subject for Chinese opera. There is a drama film named Xue Dingshan San Qi Fan Lihua based on the couple.

Film and television
Portrayed by Jessica Hsuan in the 2004 TVB series Lady Fan
Portrayed by Qin Lan in the 2012 historical series  (Great Tang's Female General: Fan Lihua)

References 

Legendary Chinese people
Chinese warriors
Women warriors
Women in ancient Chinese warfare